The Jennings-Clerke Baronetcy, of Duddlestone Hall in the County of Shropshire, was a title in the Baronetage of Great Britain. It was created on 26 October 1774 for Philip Jennings-Clerke, Member of Parliament for Totnes. The title became extinct on the death of his son Sir Charles Philip Jennings, 2nd Baronet, who died just a few months after his father in 1788.

Clerke baronets, of Duddlestone Hall (1774)
Sir Philip Jennings-Clerke, 1st Baronet (1722–1788)
Sir Charles Philip Jennings, 2nd Baronet (died 22 April 1788) buried in Lyndhurst, Hampshire with a memorial sculpted by John Flaxman.

See also
Clerke baronets

Notes

References

Jennings-Clerke